Godzilliidae is a family of remipedes in the order Nectiopoda. There are at least two genera and four described species in Godzilliidae.

Genera
These two genera belong to the family Godzilliidae:
 Godzilliognomus Yager, 1989
 Godzillius Schram, Yager & Emerson, 1986

References

Further reading

 
 

Remipedia
Articles created by Qbugbot
Crustacean families